Bryan Murrell (born 3 April ) is an English former professional rugby league footballer who played in the 1970s and 1980s.

Background
Bryan Murrell's birth was registered in Leeds district, West Riding of Yorkshire, England, and he was a pupil at Stainbeck High School.

Playing career

Challenge Cup Final appearances
Bryan Murrell played  in Leeds' 16-7 victory over Widnes in the 1976–77 Challenge Cup Final during the 1976–77 season at Wembley Stadium, London on Saturday 7 May 1977, in front of a crowd of 80,871.

Club career

Genealogical information
Bryan Murrell is the father of the rugby league footballer; Scott Murrell.

References

External links

1955 births
Living people
English rugby league players
Hunslet R.L.F.C. players
Leeds Rhinos players
Rugby league centres
Rugby league five-eighths
Rugby league fullbacks
Rugby league players from Leeds
Rugby league wingers